Bob Hagan (born 8 January 1940) is an Australian former rugby league footballer, and coach. He played for Easts (Brisbane) in Queensland and for Canterbury-Bankstown in New South Wales, representing both states as well as playing for the Australian national side, he also played for Huddersfield in England. He is the older brother (not the father) of rugby league player and coach, Mick Hagan.

Playing career
Hagan represented the Commonwealth XIII rugby league team while at Huddersfield in 1965 against New Zealand at Crystal Palace National Recreation Centre, London on Wednesday 18 August 1965.

He played for Canterbury-Bankstown in their 1967 NSWRL grand final defeat against South Sydney at the Sydney Cricket Ground.

Post playing
Hagan coached Canterbury-Bankstown in 1970-71 and was later a board member under club stalwart Peter Moore.  Hagan took over as CEO of Canterbury when Moore retired in 1996 and was in that position when the salary cap scandal of 2002 broke.  He resigned from the club immediately and retired to Queensland. His replacement was Steve Mortimer.

References

External links
Queensland representatives at qrl.com.au
Player Statistics at rugbyleagueproject.org
Coach statistics at rugbyleagueproject.org

1940 births
Living people
Australia national rugby league team players
Australian rugby league administrators
Australian rugby league coaches
Australian rugby league players
Canterbury-Bankstown Bulldogs coaches
Canterbury-Bankstown Bulldogs players
City New South Wales rugby league team players
Eastern Suburbs Tigers players
Huddersfield Giants players
New South Wales rugby league team players
Norths Devils coaches
Place of birth missing (living people)
Queensland rugby league team players